Mehenj (also known as Manhaj, Meharj, Mīnīj, and Mininj) is a village in Qaen Rural District, in the Central District of Qaen County, South Khorasan Province, Iran. At the 2006 census, its population was 439, in 105 families.

References 

Populated places in Qaen County